The following list includes all of the Canadian Register of Historic Places listings in New Westminster, British Columbia.

New Westminster
New Westminster